National Highway 168, commonly called NH 168 is a national highway in  India. It is a spur road of National Highway 68. NH-168 traverses the states of Gujarat and Rajasthan in India.

Route

Gujarat 
Tharad, Dhanera, Panthvada

=== Rajasthan Mandar, Anandra, Sirohi .

Junctions  
 
  Terminal near Tharad.
  near Dhanera.
  Terminal near Sirohi.

See also 
 List of National Highways in India
 List of National Highways in India by state

References

External links 
NH 168 on OpenStreetMap

National highways in India
National Highways in Rajasthan
National Highways in Gujarat